Adam Maximilian Aron (born September 30, 1954) is an American businessman and the chairman and CEO of AMC Entertainment Holdings, Inc. More recently, he became a co-owner of the Philadelphia 76ers, additionally serving as its CEO from 2011 to 2013. Aron had previously served as President and CEO of Norwegian Cruise Line, from 1993 to 1996, as well as Chairman and CEO of Vail Resorts from 1996 to 2006, and continues to serve on the board of directors. In 2006, Aron formed a personal consultancy, World Leisure Partners, Inc. His contributions were hailed by Newsweek during his time at Vail with the headline: "Vail Resorts is a peak performer. CEO Adam Aron has transformed the U.S. ski industry."

Biography
Born to a Jewish family Aron graduated from Abington Senior High School in suburban Philadelphia, PA. He then attended Harvard University, where he graduated cum laude with a bachelor's degree in government, and an MBA with distinction from the Business School. In addition to his tenure as CEO of Vail Resorts, the second-largest ski resort operator worldwide, and CEO of Norwegian Cruise Line, then the fourth-largest cruise company in the world, he also was Senior Vice President Marketing for United Airlines and for Hyatt Hotels Corp.

Aron was selected by the U.S. Secretary of Defense to participate in the Joint Civilian Orientation Conference in 2004, he was appointed by the U.S. Secretary of Agriculture to serve on the board of directors of the National Forest Foundation from 2000 to 2006, and was a delegate to President Clinton’s 1995 White House Conference on Travel and Tourism. He has more than 35 years of experience managing companies operating in the travel and leisure industries.

Throughout his career, Aron launched numerous award winning marketing programs. Ad Age magazine named him twice to its Ad Age 100 – the 100 best marketing executives in the US. In 2007, Travel Weekly magazine named him to its Club 33—the 33 most influential executives in travel and tourism worldwide.

AMC era
Aron was named CEO of AMC movie theaters in late 2015. Aron was the subject of a number of high-profile pieces in magazines such as Variety that lauded him and his transformation strategy at AMC.

In 2021, Aron took the unusual step of publicly engaging with his investor base via Twitter. He follows about 2,600 AMC retail stockholders on the platform, and has about 257,000 followers as of June 2022.

Controversy
When AMC announced that most of their theaters would reopen in mid-July 2020, the initial announcement said masks would be recommended but not mandatory:  "we are strongly encouraging our guests to wear masks all across the country, but not requiring it" and "We did not want to be drawn into a political controversy . . . We thought it might be counterproductive if we forced mask wearing on those people who believe strongly that it is not necessary." But after massive pushback from the public, Aron changed the policy to require masks:
"This announcement prompted an intense and immediate outcry from our customers, and it is clear from this response that we did not go far enough on the usage of masks," Aron said.

References

External links
 

Living people
Businesspeople from Philadelphia
1954 births
Harvard Business School alumni
American chief executives of professional sports organizations
American chief executives of travel and tourism industry companies
20th-century American Jews
21st-century American Jews